The women's long jump at the 2015 Southeast Asian Games was held in National Stadium, Singapore. The track and field events took place on June 10.

Schedule
All times are (UTC+08:00)

Records

Results 
Legend
X — Failure
NM — No Mark
DNS — Did Not Start

References

Athletics at the 2015 Southeast Asian Games
Women's sports competitions in Singapore
2015 in women's athletics